"Take My Heart" is a song that was released by Al Martino in 1952. It peaked at number 9 on the UK Singles Chart, spending one week in the top 12.  In the U.S., the song reached number 12 during an eight-week stay.

Vic Damone also recorded the song and he enjoyed a brief chart success in the US reaching the number 30 spot in 1952.  A version by Toni Arden was also issued in 1952.

References

1952 singles
Al Martino songs
1952 songs
Capitol Records singles